Hexaamminecobalt(III) chloride is the chemical compound with the formula [Co(NH3)6]Cl3.  It is the chloride salt of the coordination complex [Co(NH3)6]3+, which is considered an archetypal "Werner complex", named after the pioneer of coordination chemistry, Alfred Werner. The cation itself is a metal ammine complex with six ammonia  ligands attached to the cobalt(III) ion.  

Originally salts of [Co(NH3)6]3+ were described as the luteo (Latin: yellow) complex of cobalt.  This name has been discarded as modern chemistry considers color less important than molecular structure. Other similar complexes also had color names, such as purpureo (Latin: purple) for a cobalt pentammine complex, and praseo (Greek: green) and violeo (Latin: violet) for two isomeric tetrammine complexes.

Properties and structure
[Co(NH3)6]3+ is diamagnetic, with a low-spin 3d6 octahedral Co(III) center. The cation obeys the 18-electron rule and is considered to be a classic example of an exchange inert metal complex.  As a manifestation of its inertness, [Co(NH3)6]Cl3 can be recrystallized unchanged from concentrated hydrochloric acid: the NH3 is so tightly bound to the Co(III) centers that it does not dissociate to allow its protonation. In contrast, labile metal ammine complexes, such as [Ni(NH3)6]Cl2, react rapidly with acids, reflecting the lability of the Ni(II)–NH3 bonds.  Upon heating, hexamminecobalt(III) begins to lose some of its ammine ligands, eventually producing a stronger oxidant.

The chloride ions in [Co(NH3)6]Cl3 can be exchanged with a variety of other anions such as nitrate, bromide, iodide, sulfamate to afford the corresponding [Co(NH3)6]X3 derivative.  Such salts are orange or bright yellow and display varying degrees of water solubility. The chloride ion can be also exchanged with more complex anions such as the hexathiocyanatochromate(III), yielding a pink compound with formula [Co(NH3)6][Cr(SCN)6], or the ferricyanide ion.

Preparation
[Co(NH3)6]Cl3 is prepared by treating cobalt(II) chloride with ammonia and ammonium chloride followed by oxidation.  Oxidants include hydrogen peroxide or oxygen in the presence of charcoal catalyst.  This salt appears to have been first reported by Fremy.

The acetate salt can be prepared by aerobic oxidation of cobalt(II) acetate, ammonium acetate, and ammonia in methanol.  The acetate salt is highly water-soluble to the level of 1.9 M (20 °C), versus 0.26 M for the trichloride.

Uses
[Co(NH3)6]3+ is a component of some structural biology methods (especially for DNA or RNA, where positive ions stabilize tertiary structure of the phosphate backbone), to help solve their structures by X-ray crystallography or by nuclear magnetic resonance. In the biological system, the counterions would more probably be Mg2+, but the heavy atoms of cobalt (or sometimes iridium, as in ) provide anomalous scattering to solve the phase problem and produce an electron-density map of the structure.

[Co(NH3)6]3+ is an unusual example of a water-soluble trivalent metal complex and is of utility for charge-shielding applications such as the stabilization of highly negatively charged complexes, such as interactions with and between nucleic acids.

Related compounds
Tris(ethylenediamine)cobalt(III) chloride

References

Cobalt complexes
Cobalt(III) compounds
Inorganic compounds
Chlorides
Metal halides
Octahedral compounds
Ammine complexes